Echeta trinotata is a moth of the family Erebidae. It was described by Reich in 1933. It is found in French Guiana, Brazil, Venezuela, Ecuador, Chile, and Bolivia.

References

Phaegopterina
Moths described in 1933